Barkston Ash is a small village and civil parish close to Selby in North Yorkshire, England. It was formerly known as Barkston in the West Riding of Yorkshire.

History
The village dates back to at least 1090, when it was spelled Barcestone. Now part of Selby district, the village previously gave its name to the former wapentake of Barkston Ash.  The Ash part of the name comes from a large ash tree said to be at the approximate centre of the ancient county of Yorkshire, where meetings for the wapentake would be held.

What is now the A162 London Road was a turnpike constructed in 1769: the Main Street and the major part of the village goes East from the junction with this.

Barkston Ash was also the name of the local parliamentary constituency of Barkston Ash until 1983, when its boundaries were redrawn to divide the area into Elmet and Selby.

Features
The village contains a small Church of England church, Holy Trinity, originally a chapel of ease constructed in 1880, but given its current name and status in 1974. There are two pubs, the Ash Tree (on the site of a former coaching inn) and the Boot and Shoe, a village hall and a primary school (dating from 1856).   There were formerly two shops and a post office on Main Street, now private residences.

There are three 17th to 19th century stone Grade II listed building houses near the junction of Main Street and Church Street: Laurel Farm, Barkston House, and Turpin Hall Farm.

References

External links

 Barston Ash village website
 The Ancient Parish of Sherburn in Elmet at GENUKI: Barkston Ash was in this parish

Villages in North Yorkshire
Civil parishes in North Yorkshire
Selby District